Moonloop is an EP released by British psychedelic rock and progressive rock band Porcupine Tree, prior to the release of their third studio album, The Sky Moves Sideways. It was released on vinyl and CD in the UK by Delerium Records.

The EP was also released by C+S Records in the United States under the name of Stars Die and included the song "Always Never" from the Up The Downstair album as an extra track.

Stars Die was not included on the original UK release of The Sky Moves Sideways but was included on the US version. The 2CD reissues of The Sky Moves Sideways have the track on the second disc.

The artwork used on the cover of the EP was later used on a compilation album by the band titled Stars Die: The Delerium Years 1991–1997.

Track listing

CD - UK Delerium - (CD DELEC CDS032)
 "Stars Die" – 4:57
 "Moonloop" – 18:04

Vinyl - UK Delerium - (EP032)

Side A
 "Stars Die" – 4:57

Side B
 "Moonloop" – 18:04

US CD - US C&S Records - (CS2024-2) (titled as "Stars Die")
 "Stars Die" – 4:57
 "Moonloop" (Version) – 18:04
 "Always Never" – 6:58

Personnel

 Steven Wilson - Vocals, guitars, keyboards, mixing
 Colin Edwin - Bass 
 Chris Maitland - Drums
 Rick Edwards - Percussion

References

External links
Porcupine Tree Official Website
The complete Steven Wilson discography
Steven Wilson Headquarters

1994 debut EPs
Porcupine Tree EPs